Vaivina is a village in Toila Parish, Ida-Viru County in northeastern Estonia.

Actor and film director Kaljo Kiisk (1925–2007), was born in Vaivina.

References

 Vaivina e-kaardil
 

Villages in Ida-Viru County